Rajesh Sharma (1 December 1973) is an Indian actor, who appears in Malayalam movies. He acted in several dramas and debuted in Malayalam movie industry in 2005.

Background

Rajesh Sharma was born on 1 December 1973 at Kollam in Kerala. He completed his drama education in 1996 from the center for performing arts at Sopanam Kalakendram in Kollam. Rajesh started his career as a drama artist and acted in more than 50 dramas. He has won the Best Actor Awards Constituted by Kerala Sangeetha Nataka Akademi for the play Ambalapravu (2001) "Makkalkoottam"(2010) and for the play " Section 302-Murder" (2013). He is active in Malayalam film industry since 2005. Rajesh has done a number of notable roles in several Malayalam hit movies namely Annayum Rasoolum, Aanandam, Oru Vadakkan Selfie, Loham etc.

Filmography

References

External links
 

Indian male film actors
Male actors from Kollam
Male actors in Malayalam cinema
21st-century Indian male actors
Living people
1973 births